The 2020–21 Dallas Mavericks season was the 41st season of the franchise in the National Basketball Association (NBA). The Mavericks clinched the Southwest division for the first time since the 2009-10 season following a 110–90 victory over the Cleveland Cavaliers on May 7, 2021. However, the Mavericks lost in the first round to the Los Angeles Clippers for the second consecutive season in seven games.

Following the season on June 17, 2021, long time head coach Rick Carlisle resigned from his position as head coach after 13 seasons and leading the team to a championship in 2011.

Draft

1 The Mavericks acquired the second-round pick from the Golden State Warriors.

Roster

Standings

Division

Conference

Notes
 z – Clinched home court advantage for the entire playoffs
 c – Clinched home court advantage for the conference playoffs
 y – Clinched division title
 x – Clinched playoff spot
 pb – Clinched play-in spot
 o – Eliminated from playoff contention
 * – Division leader

Game log

Preseason
The preseason schedule was announced on November 27, 2020.

|-style="background:#cfc;"
| 1
| December 12
| @ Milwaukee
| 
| Dončić, Kleber (13)
| Nate Hinton (8)
| three players (4)
| Fiserv Forum0
| 1–0
|-style="background:#cfc;"
| 2
| December 14
| @ Milwaukee
| 
| Luka Dončić (27)
| Dorian Finney-Smith (11)
| Burke, Dončić (4)
| Fiserv Forum0
| 2–0
|-style="background:#fcc;"
| 3
| December 17
| Minnesota
| 
| Luka Dončić (20)
| Hardaway Jr., Powell (6)
| Luka Dončić (7)
| American Airlines Center0
| 2–1

Regular season
The schedule for the first half was announced on December 4, 2020. The second half was revealed on February 24, 2021.

|-style="background:#fcc;"
| 1
| December 23
| @ Phoenix
| 
| Luka Dončić (32)
| Dončić,Finney-Smith (8)
| Luka Dončić (5)
| PHX Arena0
| 0–1
|-style="background:#fcc;"
| 2
| December 25
| @ L. A. Lakers
| 
| Luka Dončić (27)
| Maxi Kleber (5)
| Luka Dončić (7)
| Staples Center0
| 0–2
|-style="background:#cfc;"
| 3
| December 27
| @ L. A. Clippers
| 
| Luka Dončić (24)
| Luka Dončić (9)
| Luka Dončić (8)
| Staples Center0
| 1–2
|-style="background:#fcc;"
| 4
| December 30
| Charlotte
| 
| Tim Hardaway Jr. (18)
| three players (6)
| Luka Dončić (5)
| American Airlines Center0
| 1–3

|-style="background:#cfc;"
| 5
| January 1
| Miami
| 
| Luka Dončić (27)
| Luka Dončić (15)
| Luka Dončić (7)
| American Airlines Center0
| 2–3
|-style="background:#fcc;"
| 6
| January 3
| @ Chicago
| 
| Jalen Brunson (31)
| Finney-Smith,Marjanović (6)
| Jalen Brunson (7)
| United Center0
| 2–4
|-style="background:#cfc;"
| 7
| January 4
| @ Houston
| 
| Luka Dončić (33)
| Luka Dončić (16)
| Luka Dončić (11)
| Toyota Center0
| 3–4
|-style="background:#cfc;"
| 8
| January 7
| @ Denver
| 
| Luka Dončić (38)
| Cauley-Stein,Dončić (9)
| Luka Dončić (13)
| Ball Arena0
| 4–4
|-style="background:#cfc;"
| 9
| January 9
| Orlando
| 
| Tim Hardaway Jr. (36)
| Luka Dončić (11)
| Luka Dončić (10)
| American Airlines Center0
| 5–4
|-style="background:#ccc;"
| –
| January 11
| New Orleans
| colspan="6" | Postponed (COVID-19) (Makeup date: May 12)
|-style="background:#cfc;"
| 10
| January 13
| @ Charlotte
| 
| Luka Dončić (34)
| Willie Cauley-Stein (14)
| Luka Dončić (9)
| Spectrum Center0
| 6–4
|-style="background:#fcc;"
| 11
| January 15
| @ Milwaukee
| 
| Luka Dončić (28)
| Willie Cauley-Stein (11)
| Luka Dončić (13)
| Fiserv Forum0
| 6–5
|-style="background:#fcc;"
| 12
| January 17
| Chicago
| 
| Luka Dončić (36)
| Luka Dončić (16)
| Luka Dončić (15)
| American Airlines Center0
| 6–6
|-style="background:#fcc;"
| 13
| January 18
| @ Toronto
| 
| Kristaps Porziņģis (23)
| Kristaps Porziņģis (9)
| Luka Dončić (9)
| Amalie Arena0
| 6–7
|-style="background:#cfc;"
| 14
| January 20
| @ Indiana
| 
| Kristaps Porziņģis (27)
| Kristaps Porziņģis (13)
| Luka Dončić (12)
| Bankers Life Fieldhouse0
| 7–7
|-style="background:#cfc;"
| 15
| January 22
| @ San Antonio
| 
| Luka Dončić (36)
| Luka Dončić (9)
| Luka Dončić (11)
| AT&T Center0
| 8–7
|-style="background:#fcc;"
| 16
| January 23
| Houston
| 
| Luka Dončić (26)
| Boban Marjanović (12)
| Luka Dončić (8)
| American Airlines Center0
| 8–8
|-style="background:#fcc;"
| 17
| January 25
| Denver
| 
| Luka Dončić (35)
| Luka Dončić (11)
| Luka Dončić (16)
| American Airlines Center0
| 8–9
|-style="background:#fcc;"
| 18
| January 27
| @ Utah
| 
| Luka Dončić (30)
| James Johnson (7)
| Luka Dončić (6)
| Vivint Arena1,932
| 8–10
|-style="background:#fcc;"
| 19
| January 29
| @ Utah
| 
| Luka Dončić (25)
| Kristaps Porziņģis (9)
| Luka Dončić (7)
| Vivint Arena1,932
| 8–11
|-style="background:#fcc;"
| 20
| January 30
| Phoenix
| 
| Luka Dončić (29)
| Willie Cauley-Stein (9)
| Luka Dončić (7)
| American Airlines Center0
| 8–12

|-style="background:#fcc;"
| 21
| February 1
| Phoenix
| 
| Luka Dončić (25)
| Kristaps Porziņģis (10)
| Luka Dončić (8)
| American Airlines Center0
| 8–13
|-style="background:#cfc;"
| 22
| February 3
| @ Atlanta
| 
| Luka Dončić (27)
| Kristaps Porziņģis (11)
| Luka Dončić (14)
| State Farm Arena0
| 9–13
|-style="background:#fcc;"
| 23
| February 4
| Golden State
| 
| Luka Dončić (27)
| Maxi Kleber (7)
| Luka Dončić (6)
| American Airlines Center0
| 9–14
|-style="background:#cfc;"
| 24
| February 6
| Golden State
| 
| Luka Dončić (42)
| Kristaps Porziņģis (10)
| Luka Dončić (11)
| American Airlines Center0
| 10–14
|-style="background:#cfc;"
| 25
| February 8
| Minnesota
| 
| Kristaps Porziņģis (27)
| Kristaps Porziņģis (13)
| Josh Richardson (8)
| American Airlines Center1,000
| 11–14
|-style="background:#cfc;"
| 26
| February 10
| Atlanta
| 
| Luka Dončić (28)
| Luka Dončić (10)
| Luka Dončić (10)
| American Airlines Center1,000
| 12–14
|-style="background:#cfc;"
| 27
| February 12
| New Orleans
| 
| Luka Dončić (46)
| Luka Dončić (8)
| Luka Dončić (12)
| American Airlines Center1,514
| 13–14
|-style="background:#fcc;"
| 28
| February 14
| Portland
| 
| Luka Dončić (44)
| Kristaps Porziņģis (8)
| Luka Dončić (9)
| American Airlines Center2,211
| 13–15
|-style="background:#ccc;"
| –
| February 17
| Detroit
| colspan="6" | Postponed (winter storm)  (Makeup date: April 21)
|-style="background:#ccc;"
| –
| February 19
| @ Houston
| colspan="6" | Postponed (winter storm)  (Makeup date: April 7)
|-style="background:#cfc;"
| 29
| February 22
| Memphis
| 
| Tim Hardaway Jr. (29)
| Dorian Finney-Smith (9)
| Luka Dončić (5)
| American Airlines Center2,099
| 14–15
|-style="background:#cfc;"
| 30
| February 23
| Boston
| 
| Luka Dončić (31)
| Luka Dončić (10)
| Luka Dončić (8)
| American Airlines Center3,338
| 15–15
|-style="background:#fcc;"
| 31
| February 25
| @ Philadelphia
| 
| Luka Dončić (19)
| Boban Marjanović (12)
| Luka Dončić (4)
| Wells Fargo Center0
| 15–16
|-style="background:#cfc;"
| 32
| February 27
| @ Brooklyn
| 
| Luka Dončić (27)
| Dorian Finney-Smith (8)
| Luka Dončić (7)
| Barclays Center684
| 16–16

|-style="background:#cfc;"
| 33
| March 1
| @ Orlando
| 
| Luka Dončić (33)
| Dončić,Porziņģis (10)
| Luka Dončić (9)
| Amway Center3,766
| 17–16
|-style="background:#cfc;"
| 34
| March 3
| Oklahoma City
| 
| Hardaway Jr.,Porziņģis (9)
| Kristaps Porziņģis (13)
| Trey Burke (6)
| American Airlines Center3,508
| 18–16
|-style="background:#cfc;"
| 35
| March 10
| San Antonio
| 
| Kristaps Porziņģis (28)
| Kristaps Porziņģis (14)
| Luka Dončić (12)
| American Airlines Center3,813
| 19–16
|-style="background:#fcc;"
| 36
| March 11
| @ Oklahoma City
| 
| Josh Richardson (27)
| Dorian Finney-Smith (8)
| Josh Richardson (6)
| Chesapeake Energy Arena0
| 19–17
|-style="background:#cfc;"
| 37
| March 13
| @ Denver
| 
| Kristaps Porziņģis (25)
| Dwight Powell (11)
| Luka Dončić (12)
| Ball Arena0
| 20–17
|-style="background:#fcc;"
| 38
| March 15
| L. A. Clippers
| 
| Luka Dončić (25)
| Luka Dončić (10)
| Luka Dončić (16)
| American Airlines Center3,945
| 20–18
|-style="background:#cfc;"
| 39
| March 17
| L. A. Clippers
| 
| Luka Dončić (42)
| Kristaps Porziņģis (13)
| Luka Dončić (9)
| American Airlines Center3,975
| 21–18
|-style="background:#fcc;"
| 40
| March 19
| @ Portland
| 
| Luka Dončić (38)
| Luka Dončić (9)
| Luka Dončić (9)
| Moda Center0
| 21–19
|-style="background:#cfc;"
| 41
| March 21
| @ Portland
| 
| Luka Dončić (37)
| Kristaps Porziņģis (8)
| three players (4)
| Moda Center0
| 22–19
|-style="background:#cfc;"
| 42
| March 24
| @ Minnesota
| 
| Kristaps Porziņģis (29)
| Jalen Brunson (11)
| Jalen Brunson (5)
| Target Center0
| 23–19
|-style="background:#fcc;"
| 43
| March 26
| Indiana
| 
| Kristaps Porziņģis (31)
| Kristaps Porziņģis (18)
| Porziņģis,Richardson (3)
| American Airlines Center4,132
| 23–20
|-style="background:#fcc;"
| 44
| March 27
| New Orleans
| 
| Tim Hardaway Jr. (30)
| Boban Marjanović (11)
| three players (4)
| Smoothie King Center3,700
| 23–21
|-style="background:#cfc;"
| 45
| March 29
| @ Oklahoma City
| 
| Luka Dončić (25)
| Kristaps Porziņģis (9)
| Jalen Brunson (7)
| Chesapeake Energy Arena0
| 24–21
|-style="background:#cfc;"
| 46
| March 31
| @ Boston
| 
| Luka Dončić (36)
| Dorian Finney-Smith (9)
| Luka Dončić (5)
| TD Garden2,298
| 25–21

|-style="background:#cfc;"
| 47
| April 2
| @ New York
| 
| Luka Dončić (26)
| Dorian Finney-Smith (9)
| Luka Dončić (7)
| Madison Square Garden1,981
| 26–21
|-style="background:#cfc;"
| 48
| April 3
| @ Washington
| 
| Luka Dončić (26)
| Boban Marjanović (12)
| Luka Dončić (6)
| Capital One Arena0
| 27–21
|-style="background:#cfc;"
| 49
| April 5
| Utah
| 
| Luka Dončić (31)
| Luka Dončić (9)
| Luka Dončić (8)
| American Airlines Center4,261
| 28–21
|-style="background:#fcc;"
| 50
| April 7
| @ Houston
| 
| Dončić,Porziņģis (23)
| Kristaps Porziņģis (12)
| Luka Dončić (5)
| Toyota Center3,399
| 28–22
|-style="background:#cfc;"
| 51
| April 8
| Milwaukee
| 
| Luka Dončić (27)
| Kristaps Porziņģis (17)
| Luka Dončić (9)
| American Airlines Center4,190
| 29–22
|-style="background:#fcc;"
| 52
| April 11
| San Antonio
| 
| Kristaps Porziņģis (31)
| Kristaps Porziņģis (15)
| Luka Dončić (7)
| American Airlines Center4,054
| 29–23
|-style="background:#fcc;"
| 53
| April 12
| Philadelphia
| 
| Luka Dončić (32)
| Dorian Finney-Smith (11)
| Luka Dončić (4)
| American Airlines Center4,016
| 29–24
|-style="background:#cfc;"
| 54
| April 14
| @ Memphis
| 
| Luka Dončić (29)
| Brunson,Kleber (8)
| Brunson,Dončić  (9)
| FedExForum2,141
| 30–24
|-style="background:#fcc;"
| 55
| April 16
| New York
| 
| Kristaps Porziņģis  (23)
| Kristaps Porziņģis  (12)
| Luka Dončić (19)
| American Airlines Center4,246
| 30–25
|-style="background:#fcc;"
| 56
| April 18
| Sacramento
| 
| Luka Dončić (30)
| Luka Dončić (8)
| Luka Dončić (4)
| American Airlines Center4,193
| 30–26
|-style="background:#cfc;"
| 57
| April 21
| Detroit
| 
| Luka Dončić (37)
| Luka Dončić (10)
| Luka Dončić (9)
| American Airlines Center4,043
| 31–26
|-style="background:#cfc;"
| 58
| April 22
| L. A. Lakers
| 
| Luka Dončić (30)
| Luka Dončić (9)
| Luka Dončić (8)
| American Airlines Center4,443
| 32–26
|-style="background:#cfc;"
| 59
| April 24
| L. A. Lakers
| 
| Dwight Powell (25)
| Dwight Powell (10)
| Luka Dončić (13)
| American Airlines Center4,561
| 33–26
|-style="background:#fcc;"
| 60
| April 26
| @ Sacramento
| 
| Luka Dončić (24)
| three players (7)
| Luka Dončić (8)
| Golden 1 Center0
| 33–27
|-style="background:#cfc;"
| 61
| April 27
| @ Golden State
| 
| Luka Dončić (39)
| Finney-Smith,Powell (8)
| Luka Dončić (8)
| Chase Center3,613
| 34–27
|-style="background:#cfc;"
| 62
| April 29
| @ Detroit
| 
| Tim Hardaway Jr. (42)
| three playres (7)
| Jalen Brunson (4)
| Little Caesars Arena750
| 35–27

|-style="background:#cfc;"
| 63
| May 1
| Washington
| 
| Luka Dončić (31)
| Cauley-Stein,Dončić (12)
| Luka Dončić (20)
| American Airlines Center4,351
| 36–27
|-style="background:#fcc;"
| 64
| May 2
| Sacramento
| 
| Luka Dončić (30)
| Marjanović,Powell (7)
| Luka Dončić (6)
| American Airlines Center4,268
| 36–28
|-style="background:#cfc;"
| 65
| May 4
| @ Miami
| 
| Tim Hardaway Jr. (36)
| Luka Dončić (12)
| Luka Dončić (8)
| American Airlines Arena0
| 37–28
|-style="background:#cfc;"
| 66
| May 6
| Brooklyn
| 
| Luka Dončić (24)
| Dončić,Powell (10)
| Luka Dončić (8)
| American Airlines Center4,602
| 38–28
|-style="background:#cfc;"
| 67
| May 7
| Cleveland
| 
| Luka Dončić (24)
| Luka Dončić (8)
| Jalen Brunson (6)
| American Airlines Center4,220
| 39–28
|-style="background:#cfc;"
| 68
| May 9
| @ Cleveland
| 
| Tim Hardaway Jr. (25)
| Dwight Powell (9)
| Luka Dončić (5)
| Rocket Mortgage FieldHouse4,148
| 40–28
|-style="background:#fcc;"
| 69
| May 11
| @ Memphis
| 
| Tim Hardaway Jr. (19)
| Willie Cauley-Stein (8)
| Luka Dončić (5)
| FedExForum2,684
| 40–29
|-style="background:#cfc;"
| 70
| May 12
| New Orleans
| 
| Luka Dončić (33)
| Dončić,Powell (8)
| Luka Dončić (8)
| American Airlines Center4,373
| 41–29
|-style="background:#cfc;"
| 71
| May 14
| Toronto
| 
| Kristaps Porziņģis (21)
| Dončić,Porziņģis (10)
| Luka Dončić (11)
| American Airlines Center4,493
| 42–29
|-style="background:#fcc;"
| 72
| May 16
| @ Minnesota
| 
| Dončić,Porziņģis (18)
| Dwight Powell (8)
| Luka Dončić (2)
| Target Center1,638
| 42–30

Postseason

|-style="background:#cfc;"
| 1
| May 22
| @ L. A. Clippers
| 
| Luka Dončić (31)
| Luka Dončić (10)
| Luka Dončić (11)
| Staples Center6,117
| 1–0
|-style="background:#cfc;"
| 2
| May 25
| @ L. A. Clippers
| 
| Luka Dončić (39)
| Luka Dončić (7)
| Luka Dončić (7)
| Staples Center6,885
| 2–0
|-style="background:#fcc;"
| 3
| May 28
| L. A. Clippers
| 
| Luka Dončić (44)
| Luka Dončić (9)
| Luka Dončić (9)
| American Airlines Center17,705
| 2–1
|-style="background:#fcc;"
| 4
| May 30
| L. A. Clippers
| 
| Luka Dončić (19)
| Dorian Finney-Smith (8)
| Luka Dončić (6)
| American Airlines Center17,761
| 2–2
|-style="background:#cfc;"
| 5
| June 2
| @ L. A. Clippers
| 
| Luka Dončić (42)
| Luka Dončić (8)
| Luka Dončić (14)
| Staples Center7,428
| 3–2
|-style="background:#fcc;"
| 6
| June 4
| L. A. Clippers
| 
| Luka Dončić (29)
| Boban Marjanović (9)
| Luka Dončić (11)
| American Airlines Center18,324
| 3–3
|-style="background:#fcc;"
| 7
| June 6
| @ L. A. Clippers
| 
| Luka Dončić (46)
| Kristaps Porziņģis (11)
| Luka Dončić (14)
| Staples Center7,342
| 3–4
|-

Player statistics

Regular season
As of May 16, 2021.

|-
| 
| 18 || 0 || 3.9 || .318 || .250 || .600 || 1.1 || .2 || .0 || .1 || 1.0
|-
| 
| 68 || 12 || 25.0 || .523 || .405 || .795 || 3.4 || 3.5 || .5 || .0 || 12.6
|-
| 
| 62 || 1 || 14.7 || .428 || .354 || .895 || 0.9 || 1.3 || .6 || .1 || 6.6
|-
| 
| 53 || 16 || 17.1 || style=background:#0B60AD;color:white;|.632 || .091 || .628 || 4.5 || .7 || .4 || .8 || 5.3
|-
| 
| 66 || style=background:#0B60AD;color:white;|66 || style=background:#0B60AD;color:white;|34.3 || .479 || .350 || .730 || 8.0 || style=background:#0B60AD;color:white;|8.6 || 1.0 || .5 || style=background:#0B60AD;color:white;|27.7
|-
| 
| 60 || 60 || 32.0 || .472 || .394 || .756 || 5.4 || 1.7 || .9 || .4 || 9.8
|-
| 
| 39 || 5 || 11.4 || .452 || .160 || .565 || 2.0 || .7 || .4 || .1 || 2.6
|-
| 
| style=background:#0B60AD;color:white;|70 || 31 || 28.4 || .447 || .391 || .816 || 3.3 || 1.8 || .4 || .2 || 16.6
|-
| 
| 21 || 0 || 4.4 || .357 || .211 || .700 || .4 || .4 || .3 || .1 || 2.0
|-
| ‡
| 23 || 3 || 12.5 || .327 || .130 || .857 || 1.9 || .4 || .4 || .1 || 2.1
|-
| ‡
| 29 || 1 || 17.4 || .462 || .250 || .586 || 3.0 || 1.7 || .8 || .8 || 5.7
|-
| 
| 50 || 40 || 26.8 || .422 || style=background:#0B60AD;color:white;|.410 || style=background:#0B60AD;color:white;|.919 || 5.2 || 1.4 || .5 || .7 || 7.1
|-
| 
| 33 || 3 || 8.2 || .508 || .125 || .816 || 3.9 || .3 || .1 || .2 || 4.7
|-
| ≠
| 23 || 4 || 14.1 || .378 || .333 || .722 || 2.8 || .8 || .2 || .1 || 4.0
|-
| 
| 43 || 43 || 30.9 || .476 || .376 || .855 || style=background:#0B60AD;color:white;|8.9 || 1.6 || .5 || style=background:#0B60AD;color:white;|1.3 || 20.1
|-
| 
| 58 || 19 || 16.7 || .619 || .238 || .782 || 4.0 || 1.1 || .6 || .5 || 5.9
|-
| ≠
| 13 || 0 || 11.3 || .358 || .395 || .800 || .9 || .8 || .2 || .1 || 4.4
|-
| 
| 59 || 56 || 30.3 || .427 || .330 || .917 || 3.3 || 2.6 || 1.0 || .4 || 12.1
|-
| 
| 11 || 0 || 5.1 || .313 || .000 || .333 || .5 || .5 || .5 || .0 || 1.0
|}
‡Traded during the season
≠Acquired during the season

Playoffs
As of June 6, 2021.

|-
| 
| 7 || 0 || 16.3 || .455 || style=background:#0B60AD;color:white;|.462 || .769 || 2.6 || 1.4 || .0 || .0 || 8.0
|-
| 
| 2 || 0 || 8.5 || .000 || .000 || .500 || .5 || .5 || .0 || .0 || .5
|-
| 
| 6 || 0 || 10.5 || .667 || .000 || 1.000 || 2.7 || .5 || .3 || .7 || 2.5
|-
| 
| 7 || 7 || style=background:#0B60AD;color:white;|40.1 || .490 || .408 || .529 || 3.9 || style=background:#0B60AD;color:white;|10.3 || 1.3 || .4 || style=background:#0B60AD;color:white;|35.7
|-
| 
| 7 || 7 || 38.7 || .406 || .432 || .800 || 6.6 || 2.1 || 1.1 || .3 || 10.3
|-
| 
| 1 || 0 || 4.0 || .000 || .000 || .000 || .0 || .0 || .0 || .0 || .0
|-
| 
| 7 || 7 || 37.4 || .416 || .404 || .750 || 3.3 || 1.4 || .4 || .0 || 17.0
|-
| 
| 7 || 4 || 26.7 || .400 || .400 || .714 || 3.6 || 1.4 || .4 || .0 || 5.3
|-
| 
| 4 || 3 || 20.8 || .513 || .000 || .778 || style=background:#0B60AD;color:white;|8.0 || 1.0 || .0 || .3 || 11.8
|-
| ≠
| 3 || 0 || 6.3 || .000 || .000 || .000 || 2.0 || .0 || .3 || .0 || .0
|-
| 
| 7 || 7 || 33.3 || .472 || .296 || .842 || 5.4 || 1.3 || 1.3 || .7 || 13.1
|-
| 
| 7 || 0 || 7.4 || style=background:#0B60AD;color:white;|.875 || .000 || .833 || 1.9 || .9 || .3 || .0 || 2.7
|-
| 
| 7 || 0 || 13.4 || .393 || .300 || 1.000 || 1.6 || .7 || .3 || .0 || 4.9
|}

Transactions

Trades

Free agents

Subtractions

Awards

Notes

References

Dallas Mavericks seasons
Dallas Mavericks
Dallas Mavericks
Dallas Mavericks